Fladungen is a town in the Rhön-Grabfeld district, in Bavaria, Germany. It is situated in the Rhön Mountains, 11 km northwest of Ostheim, 20 km west of Meiningen, and 33 km east of Fulda.  It is the northernmost town in Bavaria, bordering Hesse to the northwest and Thuringia to the northeast.

Fladungen lies at the southern edge of the Rhön Mountains, and the Rhön Biosphere Reserve begins a few kilometers outside of town.  It is at the head of the river Streu, which flows southeast through it to join the Franconian Saale near Bad Neustadt.  The region around the town is popular for hiking and cycling, especially in the summer and early autumn.

The town is a service center for the surrounding agricultural region.  There are also some small industries, including a cement factory and a biogas plant.  The 2021 population was estimated at about 2,200.

History

Fladungen first appears in a public record in 789 AD; the town was granted "Stadtrechte" (city rights) by Louis IV, Holy Roman Emperor, in 1335.  From the 16th century onwards it was part of the Prince-Bishopric_of_Würzburg; the town coat of arms still shows the figure of a bishop with a sword and crozier, symbolizing the Prince-Bishop's combination of religious and secular power. The region around Fladungen was religiously contested during the Reformation, the Counter-Reformation and the Thirty Years War, but ultimately the town became predominantly Catholic, and remains so today.

Fladungen became part of the Kingdom of Bavaria after the Treaty of Paris in 1814.  From the 18th to the mid-20th century, Fladungen was the primary market town for the Franconian Rhön, a relatively rural and underpopulated region whose economy was dominated by agriculture, sheep-herding and timber.  During the Cold War, the border with East Germany ran through the hills around Fladungen, and the town was cut off from much of its traditional hinterland.  (A portion of the old border fence has been preserved as a memorial in the Rhön-Biosphere park, a few kilometers north of the town.)

City Council (Stadtrat)
The municipal elections in Bavaria in March 2020 led to the following composition of the city council: 

  CSU: 14.4%=2 seats
 Free voters: 23.4%=3 seats
 Voters block districts (Wählerblock Ortsteile): 21%=3 seats
 Leubach area (Leubach list): 13.6%=2 seats
 Neue Liste 20: 27.6%=4 seats

Mayors
1968-1996: Raimund Goldbach
1996-2002: Herbert Ditzel
2002: Mischa Schmitt
2002-2014Robert Müller
2014-2020: Agathe Heuser-Panten
since March 2020: Michael Schnupp

Main Sights

Fladungen is noted for the "Freilandmuseum", an open-air museum of historical houses that includes more than a dozen farmhouses as well as a church and a mill.  The town hall is unusually large; it was built by Michael Kaut, architect of the Marienberg Fortress in Würzburg, in 1628.  The town hall was renovated in 2012-13 and includes a "Museum of the Rhön".  Also noteworthy are the Maulaffenturm, a medieval tower that served for centuries as the local jail; the town walls, dating back to the 14th century and renovated repeatedly, most recently in the 1970s; and the Gangolfskapelle, a 16th-century chapel with an adjacent early 20th century-grotto atop a hill (the "Kapellenberg") 1 km outside the town center.  Much of the town was destroyed by fire in the 17th century, but the town center includes many half-timbered buildings dating from the late 17th and 18th centuries.  

A steam-powered train, the "Rhön-Zügle", runs from Fladungen to Mellrichstadt on alternate Sundays from May to October.

Services
The town has a public swimming pool and its own football club.  There is a kindergarten and a school for grades 1-4.  Regular bus services connect Fladungen to the nearby towns of Ostheim, Mellrichstadt and Bad Neustadt.  There is a hotel with a conference center, along with more than twenty smaller inns and guest houses.

Twinnings
 Kõo, Estonia (1996)
 Köyliö, Finland (1996)
 Nora, Sweden (1996)

References

Rhön-Grabfeld